Galomecalpa parsoni is a species of moth of the family Tortricidae. It is found in Ecuador (Pichincha Province) and Peru.

The ground colour of the forewings is cream, suffused and strigulated (finely streaked) with greyish brown. The hindwings are cream, suffused and strigulated with brownish.

Etymology
The species is named in honour of Mr Richard Parsons, who supported fieldwork of the authors at the Bellavista Cloud Forest Reserve.

References

External links

Moths described in 2006
Tortricidae of South America
Euliini
Taxa named by Józef Razowski